The following ships of the Indian Navy have been named Delhi:

 was formerly the  HMS Achilles acquired in 1948 from the Royal Navy and scrapped in 1978
 a  launched in 1995

Indian Navy ship names